The 1988 NSWRL season was the 81st season of professional rugby league football in Australia, and saw the first expansion of the New South Wales Rugby League Premiership outside the borders of New South Wales, and another expansion outside of Sydney, with the addition of three new teams: the Brisbane Broncos, Newcastle Knights and Gold Coast-Tweed Giants. The largest NSWRL premiership yet, sixteen clubs competed during the 1988 season, with the J J Giltinan Shield for minor premiers going to Cronulla-Sutherland Sharks. The finals culminated in a grand final for the Winfield Cup between the Canterbury-Bankstown Bulldogs and Balmain Tigers. This season NSWRL teams also competed for the 1988 Panasonic Cup.

Season summary
1988 was the year of the Australian Bicentenary celebrations, and on 4 March, the season opened with the first game of rugby league played at the newly built Sydney Football Stadium. The St. George Dragons defeated the Eastern Suburbs Roosters 24–14. Easts and South Sydney would use the SFS as their home venue from 1988. This saw the end of both the Sydney Sports Ground (which closed due to the building of the SFS) and Redfern Oval as regular venues.

The brand new Brisbane Broncos club, featuring Australian Kangaroos captain Wally Lewis and starting their first ever season of football, played their first match against the previous season's premiers the Manly-Warringah Sea Eagles and won 44–10.

Eventual grand finalists the Balmain Tigers had a dreadful start to the season with six wins and five losses by the end of the first full round. But their plight was rescued by a masterstroke from their chief executive Keith Barnes. The Great Britain side was touring Australia that season and in strict secrecy Barnes negotiated to have the English captain and centre Ellery Hanley – judged the best player in the English competition the previous season and an undoubted world-class player – to join the Tigers. Barnes got to the NSWRL to register Hanley at 4:55pm on 30 June, just five minutes inside the deadline for signing players for that season.

The 1988 season's Rothmans Medallist was Cronulla-Sutherland's Barry Russell. The Dally M Award went to Russell's teammate Gavin Miller, and Rugby League Week gave its player of the year award to Balmian's hooker, Ben Elias.

Twenty-two regular season rounds were played in total from March till August, with Cronulla-Sutherland winning their first ever minor premiership since joining the competition in 1967. Penrith and Balmain finished on equal points in fifth place and played each other for the place in the top five, alongside Cronulla, Canterbury, Canberra and Manly.

The grand finals;

  Canterbury-Bankstown Bulldogs vs  Balmain Tigers (Senior Grade)
  Eastern Suburbs vs  Manly Sea Eagles (Reserve Grade)
  Under 21s team vs  Under 21s (Under 21s Grade)

The Tests;

  Australia vs  Great Britain
  Australia vs  Rest of the World

The State of Origin;

  Queensland vs  New South Wales

Teams
This season saw the premiership's first expansion since 1982 with the addition of three newly created teams: the Brisbane Broncos, the Gold Coast-Tweed Giants and the Newcastle Knights. This brought the League another step closer to becoming a national competition as a total of sixteen teams, the largest number in the tournament's history, contested the premiership, including five Sydney-based foundation teams, another six from Sydney, two from greater New South Wales, two from Queensland, and one from the Australian Capital Territory.

Advertising
1988 saw the NSWRL move their advertising account from John Singleton Advertising to Hertz Walpole Advertising. There was initially however no shift in the prior campaign direction. For the second year running a visual and vocal performance by Australian rock journeyman John "Swanee" Swan was used. Swanee recorded a purpose-written jingle entitled "The Greatest Game of All" and a rock-clip style ad was shot on a stage setting with smoke, lights and fireworks. The performance footage was interspersed with game action.

Five years later Swan's younger brother Jimmy Barnes would also feature in an NSWRL season advertisement performing alongside Tina Turner.

Regular season

Bold – Home game
X – Bye
Opponent for round listed above margin

Ladder

South Sydney were stripped of 2 competition points due to an illegal replacement in one game.

Ladder progression

Numbers highlighted in green indicate that the team finished the round inside the top 5.
Numbers highlighted in blue indicates the team finished first on the ladder in that round.
Numbers highlighted in red indicates the team finished last place on the ladder in that round.

Finals
Balmain had staged a gripping charge for the final five, winning nine of their last eleven games including five in a row to leave them in equal fifth spot with the Penrith Panthers at the regular season's end. They then won four sudden death finals to make it to the Grand final.

Chart

Grand final

This was the first grand final not to be played at the Sydney Cricket Ground. Following Balmain's extraordinary late season run in winning thirteen of fifteen games, the stage was set for a grand final of great appeal. 1980s master coach Warren Ryan of Balmain was up against the club he had coached for four years to three grand finals and two premierships, as well as being matched against the man who had replaced him at Canterbury – Phil Gould. It was master against pupil. At just 30 years of age, Gould was vying not only to become the youngest coach to win a grand final but the first since Balmain's Leo Nosworthy in 1969 to steer a team to premiership victory in his first season coaching the top-grade.

The Canterbury-Bankstown Bulldogs faced the Balmain Tigers on 11 September 1988 in the first grand final played at the Sydney Football Stadium and the last game for Steve Mortimer. The match was played early so that Channel Ten could broadcast the 1988 Seoul Olympics. The Australian national anthem was performed by Glenn Shorrock.

After five minutes Peter Tunks was sent to the sin bin for ten minutes for treading on Ben Elias. The first points of the match were scored shortly after from Terry Lamb's successful penalty kick. Another penalty kick from Lamb put the Bulldogs in front 4 nil. However Balmain grabbed the first try an Elias put up a bomb and was first to the ball ahead of Bulldog Jason Alchin. Conlon's conversion from in front gave the Tigers the lead for first time at 6–4.

A highly controversial tackle by Terry Lamb put Balmain's in form British import Ellery Hanley out of the game before the 30-minute mark had been reached. Hanley staggered off, heavily concussed, with the score at 6–4. Under the rules of the time, Hanley was allowed 10 minutes to recover in the head bin. If he could not return he would need to be replaced. He returned just before half-time and stood, out-of-sorts, on the wing. The Bulldogs then ran in a 70-metre try from broken play and went to the break with a lead of 10–8.

Hanley did not return after half-time and the Bulldogs started to dominate. A great Canterbury team try to Michael Hagan sealed the match. Bruce McGuire scored Balmain's second try late in the match although the outcome was already clear. The match ended on a sentimental note when Gould called the Bulldog's representative star, former captain and 271 game veteran, Steve Mortimer to the sideline. He was less than fully fit and had his arm heavily padded to protect the wrist he had broken early in the season. However Mortimer had been named as a fresh reserve as tribute to his previous club contributions and the match ended with him moving to dummy half and taking the ball up for the last time.

Canterbury-Bankstown Bulldogs 24Tries: Nissen, Hagan, Gillespie, LambGoals: Lamb 4

Balmain Tigers 12Tries: Elias, McGuireGoals: Conlon 2

Clive Churchill Medal:  Paul Dunn (Canterbury)

Player statistics
The following statistics are as of the conclusion of Round 22.

Top 5 point scorers

Top 5 try scorers

Top 5 goal scorers

1988 Transfers

Players

Coaches

References

External links
 Rugby League Tables – Season 1988 The World of Rugby League.
1988 J J Giltinan Shield and Winfield Cup at rleague.com
Results:1981–90 at rabbitohs.com.au
NSWRL season 1988 at rugbyleagueproject.com

NSWRL season
New South Wales Rugby League premiership